Licuala orbicularis is a species of palm in the genus Licuala. It is endemic to southwestern Sarawak on the island of Borneo.

It grows as a rainforest understorey plant in mixed dipterocarp forest and kerangas forests, in moist valleys and on hill slopes, from 20 to 550 metres elevation.

References

External links 
 Licuala orbicularis(LCLOR)  in EPPO Global Database

orbicularis
Endemic flora of Borneo
Trees of Borneo
Taxa named by Odoardo Beccari
Flora of the Borneo lowland rain forests
Flora of the Sundaland heath forests